David Charles is an American neurologist, professor and vice-chair of neurology, and the medical director of Telehealth at Vanderbilt University Medical Center.

Education
David Charles attended Vanderbilt University School of Medicine, graduating in 1990. After completing his neurology residency at Vanderbilt University Medical Center, he joined the faculty of the Department of Neurology at Vanderbilt University in 1994. In 1995, he obtained his fellowship in Movement Disorders and Clinical Neurophysiology. In 1996, he completed the Health Care Management Program from the Owen Graduate School of Management. In January and May 1997, he completed Harvard Macy Institute's Program for Physician Educators, and in 1998, he studied deep brain stimulation, and its use as a treatment of Parkinson's disease as a Fulbright Senior Scholar at the Universitaire de Grenoble in Grenoble, France.

Professional activities
Charles is president of the Clinical Neurological Society of America, co-chair of the North American Neuromodulation Society Neurology Committee, past chairman of the Public Policy Committee of the American Neurological Association, a Fellow of the American Academy of Neurology and the American Neurological Association, and past board member of the United Council of Neurologic Subspecialties. He is a past-president of The Tennessee Academy of Neurology. From 1997 to 1998, he was a Health Policy Fellow on the staff of the Labor Subcommittee for Public Health and Safety, United States Senate.

At Vanderbilt he serves as vice-chair of neurology, and previously served as the assistant dean of admissions for the medical school and the Neurology Residency Program Director.

Alliance for Patient Access
He is also the chair of the Alliance for Patient Access, which, according to The Wall Street Journal "represents physicians and is largely funded by the pharmaceutical industry. The contributors mostly include brand-name drug makers and biotechs, but some – such as Pfizer and Amgen – are also developing biosimilars."

In 2013 he published an article on specialty drugs in which he agreed with the findings of the Congressional Budget Office that spending on prescription medications "saves costs in other areas of healthcare spending." He observed that specialty drugs are so high priced that many patients do not fill prescriptions resulting in more serious health problems increasing. His article referred to specialty drugs such as "new cancer drugs specially formulated for patients with specific genetic markers." He explained the high cost of these "individualized medications based on diagnostic testing; and "biologics," or medicines created through biologic processes, rather than chemically synthesized like most pharmaceuticals." He argued that there should be a slight increase in co-pays for the more commonly using lower-tier medications to allow a lower co-pay for those who "require high-cost specialty tier medications."

Research
Charles' research is primarily focused on movement disorders including Parkinson's disease, cervical dystonia, tremor, spasticity, and neurotoxin injections.

One of his focuses within movement disorders, particularly with Parkinson's disease, has been Deep Brain Stimulation (DBS). An article in NeurologyToday interviewed him on "20 Years of Monumental Strides in Movement Disorders." In the interview, David Charles hailed that the United States approving DBS in 2016 for mid-stage Parkinson's disease was "one of the biggest advances" in DBS. He also states that DBS is a better alternative to medication, "the data are very clear that DBS plus medicine is superior to medicine alone in controlling symptoms and improving quality of life in mid- and advanced-stage disease," backing this up with his publication, "Subthalamic Nucleus Deep Brain Stimulation May Reduce Medication Costs in Early Stage Parkinson’s Disease."

He has authored over 100 research publications and is currently the principal investigator in the only FDA approved clinical trial testing the efficacy of Deep Brain Stimulation in people with early stage Parkinson's disease.

References

External links
faculty web page

People from Decatur, Alabama
Physicians from Alabama
Vanderbilt University School of Medicine alumni
Harvard Medical School alumni
Vanderbilt University faculty
Living people
1964 births